Gioia del Colle is a railway station in Gioia del Colle, Italy. The station is located on the Bari–Taranto railway and Rocchetta Sant'Antonio-Gioia del Colle railway. The train services are operated by Trenitalia.

Train services
The station is served by the following service(s):

 High speed services (Frecciabianca) Milan - Parma - Bologna - Ancona - Pescara - Foggia - Bari - Taranto
 Intercity services Rome - Foggia - Bari - Taranto
 Intercity services Bologna - Rimini - Ancona - Pescara - Foggia - Bari - Taranto
 Night train (Intercity Notte) Milan - Ancona - Pescara - Foggia - Bari - Taranto - Brindisi - Lecce
 Local services (Treno regionale) Bari - Gioia del Colle - Taranto
 Local services (Treno regionale) Gravina in Puglia - Altamura - Gioia del Colle - Taranto

Bus services
 Rocchetta Sant'Antonio - Spinazzola - Gravina in Puglia - Altamura - Gioia del Colle

See also

References

External links

Railway stations in Apulia
Buildings and structures in the Province of Bari